Walter Frederick Roope Tyndale (1855–1943) was a British watercolourist of landscapes, architecture and street scenes, book illustrator and travel writer.

Life and works

Life as an artist

Tyndale was born and brought up in the medieval town of Bruges in Belgium, and trained initially at the "Bruges Academy of Art". When he was 16, his family returned to England, settling in Bath in Somerset for several years. At the age of 18, he returned to Belgium, studying art first at the Academy in Antwerp, then moving to Paris where he studied under Léon Bonnat and Jan van Beers.

In the 1870s, At the age of 21, circumstances obliged him to return to England in order to make a living from his art. He painted portraits and genre works in oils, and married a Miss Evelyn Dorothea Barnard. Until about 1890, he was known mainly as a portrait painter, but then moved to Haslemere in Surrey, started to teach art and switched to watercolour painting. He eventually commissioned the building of an arts and crafts-style house for himself called "Broad Dene", located on Hill Road in the town.

Tyndale travelled to the Netherlands (with friend and fellow artist Claude Hayes), then to Portugal, where he held a successful exhibition in Oporto. Subsequently he painted in England (in a sketching group organised by Helen Allingham near Maidstone in Kent), and abroad in Morocco, Tunisia, Egypt, Lebanon, Syria, Sicily, Italy and Rothenburg, Bavaria (a town he described as "a little paradise for sketchers").

Illustrated books

Tyndale was one of the first illustrators to benefit from new developments in colour printing in the early 20th century, which led to a surge in demand for illustrations for travel books. He wrote and illustrated several volumes as well as providing pictures for other authors. His first commission was from Methuen for "The New Forest" (1904), and work on subsequent books (see bibliography) led to him travelling extensively in England, Italy, the Middle East and Japan, painting landscapes, street scenes and architecture.

For the book "Wessex" (A & C Black, 1906), Tyndale painted landscapes and buildings in the west country of England, some of which had inspired Thomas Hardy's "Wessex" novels. Some of these locations were suggested by Hardy himself, who praised the "fidelity, both in form and colour" of Tyndale's work. "The Studio" magazine commented on the "excellent draughtsmanship and the care with which architectural details are rendered".

Societies, exhibitions and legacy

Tyndale was a member of the Royal Institute of Painters in Watercolours (RI), a founding member of the "Haslemere Art Society" and president of the latter between 1930–1932. Tyndale exhibited his works at various venues including the Royal Academy, the RI gallery in Piccadilly and Dowdeswell Galleries in London. His main artistic influences were his friend, the  watercolourist Claude Hayes and, to a lesser extent, Helen Allingham

Tyndale left three sizeable diaries, in which he recorded his travels, including correspondence with friends and family, postcards, photographs and some self-portraits.

Bibliography

Written and illustrated by Tyndale:

 Below the cataracts (J. B. Lippincott company, 1907).
Japan & the Japanese (MacMillan, 1910).
L'Égypte d'hier et d'aujourd'hui (Paris Hachette, 1910).
An artist in Egypt (Hodder & Stoughton, 1912).
An artist in Italy (Hodder & Stoughton, 1912).
An artist in the Riviera (Hearst's International Library, 1915).
 Hardy country water-colours (A & C Black, 1920) — abridged version of 1906 book. (Wessex (A & C Black, 1906) — painted by Walter Tyndale, described by Clive Holland. The illustrations derive from a June–July 1905 exhibition by Tyndale.)

Illustrated by Tyndale:

Hutchinson, H. G. The New Forest (Methuen, 1904)
Holland, Clive. Wessex (London: A. & C. Black, 1906)
Charles G. Harper. Wessex (London: A. & C. Black, 1911)
Taylor, Harriet Osgood. Japanese gardens (London: Methuen & Co., 1912)
Horatio Brown, Dalmatia: painted by Walter Tyndale, described by Horatio F. Brown (London: A. & C. Black, 1925)

About Tyndale:

Holland, Clive. Walter Tyndale: The man and his art (Studio International, volume 38, 1906, p288 ff).
Ackerman, Gerald M. Les orientalistes de l'Ecole britannique, volume 9 (Art Creation Realisation, 1991) pp. 282–91.

See also

 List of Orientalist artists
 Orientalism

Notes

External links

 Works by Walter Tyndale (Dorsetshire.com archive)
 Japanese figures leaving a shrine (Christie's)
 
 
 

1855 births
1943 deaths
19th-century English painters
20th-century English painters
Artists' Rifles soldiers
English watercolourists
English illustrators
English landscape painters
English male painters
English portrait painters
English travel writers
English orientalists
Orientalist painters
Royal Academy of Fine Arts (Antwerp) alumni
20th-century English male artists
19th-century English male artists